Billbergia castelensis is a plant species in the genus Billbergia. This species is endemic to Brazil.

References

castelensis
Endemic flora of Brazil
Flora of the Atlantic Forest
Flora of Espírito Santo
Plants described in 1974